Kōta, Kota, Kouta or Kohta (written: , , , ,  or ) is a masculine Japanese given name. Notable people with the name include:

, Japanese footballer
, Japanese manga artist
, Japanese professional wrestler 
, Japanese shogi player
, Japanese basketball coach
, Japanese footballer
, Japanese sprinter
, Japanese footballer
, Japanese field hockey player

Fictional characters
Kouta (Digimon), a character in the manga series Digimon Chronicle
, of the manga series Elfen Lied
, a character in the tokusatsu series Ninpuu Sentai Hurricaneger
, a character in the anime series Brave Exkaiser
, a character in the manga series My Hero Academia
, a character in the tokusatsu series Kamen Rider Gaim
, of the light novel series Kanokon
, a character in the light novel series Baka and Test

Japanese masculine given names